The 1951 Prime Minister's Resignation Honours were officially announced in a supplement to the London Gazette of 27 November 1951, published on 30 November 1951, to mark the resignation of the Prime Minister, Clement Attlee.

Earl
William Jowitt, 1st Viscount Jowitt, Lord Chancellor

Baron
David Kirkwood, MP
George Mathers, PC, MP
James Milner, MP
Frederick Wise, MP

Privy Councillor
Arthur Bottomley, MP
Douglas Jay, MP
Lord Shepherd, Chief Whip
Robert Taylor, MP

Companion of Honour
Herbert Morrison, Secretary of State for Foreign Affairs

Knight Bachelor
Walter Hannay, physician

Companion of the Order of the Bath
Denis Rickett, PPS

Companion of the Order of the British Empire
Carol Alfred Johnson, Secretary of the PLP
Arthur Moyle, MP
Ernest Popplewell, MP

Officer of the Order of the British Empire
Edward Cass, Private Secretary to the Prime Minister since 1949

References

1951 awards
November 1951 events in Europe
Prime Minister's Resignation Honours
1951 in British politics
Clement Attlee